Miloš Pavlović may refer to:
 Miloš Pavlović (racing driver) (born 1982), Serbian race car driver
 Miloš Pavlović (footballer) (born 1983), Serbian football international player
 Miloš Pavlović (chess player) in Serbia and Montenegro Chess Championship
 Miloš Pavlović (basketball), coach